Catherine Mary Hicks (born August 6, 1951) is an American retired actress. She played the character Annie Camden on the long-running television series 7th Heaven. Other roles included Dr. Faith Coleridge on the soap opera Ryan's Hope (1976–1978), her Emmy Award-nominated performance as Marilyn Monroe in Marilyn: The Untold Story (1980), Dr. Gillian Taylor in Star Trek IV: The Voyage Home (1986), and Karen Barclay in Child's Play (1988).

Early life
Hicks was born in New York City, the daughter of Jackie, a homemaker, and Walter Hicks, an electronics salesman. She is of Irish and English ancestry. Her family moved to Scottsdale, Arizona, during her childhood. After attending Saint Mary's College (Indiana), where she studied English literature and theology, Hicks won a prestigious acting fellowship to Cornell University. While at Cornell, she was a member of the Ithaca Repertory Theater Company.

Career
After graduating from Cornell with a master of fine arts degree, Hicks headed to New York in August 1976, where she immediately got work in television commercials. Two weeks after arriving in New York, she landed her first major TV role as the newly recovered pediatrician Dr. Faith Coleridge on the ABC soap opera Ryan's Hope. A year and half later, she left her role on Ryan's Hope when she was cast to star alongside Jack Lemmon (as Scottie) in Bernard Slade's 1978 Broadway play Tribute, in which she played the young model Sally Haines, whom Scottie sets up with his estranged son (Robert Picardo). That same year, she starred as Valerie in a CBS TV movie/series pilot, Sparrow.

After Tribute ended its run, she moved to California and co-starred on the 1979–80 CBS sitcom, The Bad News Bears as junior high school principal and psychologist, Dr. Emily Rappant. She had roles in a few TV movies, playing an escort, Annie, in ABC's Love For Rent (1979), and as Beth, a camp counselor in CBS's 1980 film To Race the Wind, based on the Harold Krents' autobiography.

In 1980, Hicks beat out hundreds of actresses for the lead role of Marilyn Monroe in ABC's $3.5 million production, Marilyn: The Untold Story, based on the Norman Mailer best seller. She earned an Emmy Award nomination for Outstanding Lead Actress in a Miniseries or Movie for her portrayal of the legendary star.

In 1981, Hicks starred in CBS's remake of Jacqueline Susann's Valley of the Dolls, as Anne Wells, an entertainment lawyer, and James Coburn's protege. She turned down a co-starring role in Body Heat due to the overtly sexual nature of the film. She made her feature-film debut in the thriller Death Valley (1982) as Peter Billingsley's mother, Sally. That same year, she starred as Sable in Better Late Than Never.

Hicks took the lead role as Amanda Tucker in the 12-episode detective series Tucker's Witch opposite Tim Matheson as Rick Tucker. The program aired on CBS from October 6, 1982, sporadically into August, 1983. In 1983, she played Lisa Sage and co-starred with John Schneider in CBS's romantic comedy movie Happy Endings.

Hicks appeared with Anne Bancroft and Ron Silver in Sidney Lumet's film Garbo Talks (1984). Hicks also played Bill Murray's socialite fiancée, Isabel, in the remake The Razor's Edge (1984). For her work in Star Trek IV: The Voyage Home (1986), Hicks received a Saturn Award nomination for Best Supporting Actress. That same year, she played Carol Heath in Francis Ford Coppola's Peggy Sue Got Married.

In Like Father Like Son (1987), Hicks played Dr. Amy Larkin. In March 1987, Hicks hosted the 59th Academy of Motion Picture Arts and Sciences' Scientific and Technical Awards ceremony.

In 1988, she played businesswoman Ella Frazier in the Yugoslavian comedy Tajna manastirske rakije (also released under the titles Cognac and Secret Ingredient). She co-starred with Christopher Plummer, as his estranged daughter, Tina Boyer, in Showtime's Souvenir (1989). She played Karen Barclay in the horror film Child's Play (1988). Her performance won her a 1988 Best Actress Saturn Award.

In 1989, she starred opposite Tony Danza in She's Out of Control as his girlfriend, Janet Pearson. In 1991, she co-starred in the Fox TV comedy-fantasy movie Hi Honey - I'm Dead as Carol Stadler. She played Allison Ploutzer in the Jeff Franklin ABC comedy pilot Up to No Good (1992). She starred with John Bedford Lloyd in the ABC comedy pilot The Circle Game (1993) as the mother, and schoolteacher, Nancy. She played Jeannie Barker in the Aaron Spelling primetime soap opera Winnetka Road, which had a six-episode tryout on NBC in 1994. That same year, she played the wife in the pilot for The Martin Short Show. Going into production, after the concept of the character was changed, she was replaced by Jan Hooks. She played Julia Riordan, opposite John Lithgow and Lea Salonga, in the ABC Hallmark Hall of Fame movie Redwood Curtain (1995). In 1996, she was cast as Annie Camden on The WB's family drama 7th Heaven, and she portrayed the role until the series ended, after 11 seasons, in 2007. In 1997, Hicks played flight attendant Maggie in Turbulence. The same year, Hicks played next door neighbor, Ms. Lewis, in Michael Davis' coming-of-age film, Eight Days a Week.

In 2001, she was one of the actors featured in renowned Hollywood photographer Nancy Ellison's book, Starlet: First Stage at the Hollywood Dream Factory. The book was a collection of archival material of shooting starlets and contained pictures of Hicks that Ellison had taken in the 1980s.

In 2008, she starred in Lifetime Movie Network's Poison Ivy: The Secret Society as Dean Elisabeth Graves. In another Lifetime film Stranger with My Face (2009), she played the widowed mother Shelley Stratton. She played Mom in the independent short film You're a Wolf (2009), co-starring Michael Gross and Jesse Bradford. In 2009, she again played a therapist, Dr. Rosen, in the WB's online series, Pushed.

Hicks was featured in My Name Is Jerry, an independent film shot mostly in Muncie, Indiana. Hicks won the award for Best Actress in a Supporting Role from the 2009 International Filmmakers Festival for her portrayal as Dana.

In 2010, Hicks received positive reviews for her role as Hildegarde, in playwright Christopher Durang's Why Torture Is Wrong and the People Who Love Them at the Stella Adler Theater in Hollywood. She was Texas family court Judge Harriet Krammer in the Hallmark Channel movie A Valentine's Date (2011), (which was also released under the video title Your Love Never Fails). She played Jean in the Lifetime movie Borderline Murder (2011). Hicks played bartender, Rose, who attracted the attention of Elliott Gould in the film Dorfman in Love (2011). Hicks co-starred as Anna Walker in the 2011 Walmart and Procter & Gamble Family Movie Night drama on NBC called Game Time: Tackling the Past. She joined actors Noah Wyle, Virginia Madsen, Mike Farrell, and others in a September 2011 reading of Windows on the World, by Colette Keen, at Hollywood's Stella Adler Theatre, commemorating the 10th anniversary of the 9/11 attacks.

In November 2011, she starred as Irene Livingston in the Jewish Repertory Theatre of Nevada's Las Vegas production of the Moss Hart play Light Up the Sky. Hicks played Ellen in the 2011 Hallmark Channel movie A Christmas Wedding Tail.

In May 2012, Hicks played Annette Bramble in the Lifetime Network movie Shadow of Fear. Also in May 2012, and into June, she performed in the play Princess, in the Blank Theatre Company's 20th Annual Young Playwrights Festival at the Stella Adler Theatre.

In December 2012, she played Marla Sokoloff's character's mother in the Ion Television original movie, A Christmas Wedding Date. She played Linda, a mother whose young adult son has terminal cancer, in the 2013 film, Reach. Hicks was one of the eight actresses in the Showtime documentary, That Gal... Who Was in That Thing (2015), as she shared her experiences and challenges of being a female actor.

In January 2023, Hicks revealed she was done as an actress.

Personal life
Hicks was engaged to journalist Jeff Silverman in the mid-1980s, but the engagement ended.

She met her future husband, special effects make-up artist Kevin Yagher, on the set of the film Child's Play. Hicks and Yagher were married on May 19, 1990. The two have a daughter, Caitlin, who was born in 1992.

Hicks is a practicing Roman Catholic.

Since the 1987–88 academic school year, the University of Notre Dame has given the "Catherine Hicks Award" to a graduating senior for outstanding work in theatre arts.

Hicks is an alumna of the Lee Strasberg Theatre and Film Institute and a trustee on the Hollywood Arts Council.

In 2005, Hicks appeared in a national public service announcement for Catholic Relief Services. She received the 2006 Padre Pio Award from the Capuchin Franciscan Friars for her efforts as Catholic Relief Services spokesperson and Darfur relief.

In 2010, she made appearances in several public service announcements for the Children's Advertising Review Unit (CARU).

She continued her commitment as a parent advocate by teaming with the National Community Pharmacists Association and Purdue Pharma for the 2010 Safeguard My Meds campaign to help prevent the abuse and misuse of prescription medication. Hicks appeared in a public service announcement for Catholic Relief Services in 2015.

In 2017, Hicks began working as a volunteer in California Congressman Adam Schiff's campaign office and for The League of Women Voters. She is also a member of the Los Angeles Homeless Action Committee.

Filmography

Film

Television

References

External links

 
 
 
 
 

20th-century American actresses
21st-century American actresses
Actresses from New York City
Actresses from Scottsdale, Arizona
American film actresses
American soap opera actresses
American stage actresses
American television actresses
California Democrats
American Roman Catholics
Catholics from Arizona
Catholics from New York (state)
Cornell University alumni
Saint Mary's College (Indiana) alumni
Living people
American people of English descent
American people of Irish descent
1951 births